Randy Gerard Legaspi Santiago (born November 26, 1960) is a Filipino actor, comedian, television host, singer, songwriter, producer, director and entrepreneur. He is the older brother of Raymart Santiago, Rowell Santiago and Reily Pablo L. Santiago Jr. He graduated from De La Salle University.

As an actor, Santiago has acted in movies such as Paikot-ikot, released in 1990, Pera o Bayong (Not da TV)! (2000), in which he portrayed Tiburcio, and Taray at Teroy (1988). As a film producer, he has produced movies such as "JR", released in 1983, and "Daniel Bartolo ng Sapang Bato" (1982).

Personal life
Randy is the brother of film/TV/stage director Rowell Santiago and actor Raymart Santiago, and the son of film director Pablo Santiago and actress Cielito Legaspi.

Randy is almost never seen in public without sunglasses due to lazy eye. Santiago mentioned in an interview in Magandang Buhay that his eyelid condition was a result of a cyst on his left eyelid which first appeared when he was in second grade.

Randy is married to Marilou Coronel and have three children: Raphael (born 1991), Ryan (1993–2017) and Raiko (born 2002).

Other ventures
In addition to his acting career, he is also the owner of Ratsky Bar, a restaurant chain with branches throughout the Philippines and the Middle East.

Filmography

Film

Television

Television (as director/producer)

Discography

Albums
First (Sunshine Records, released on October 22, 1988)
Scandal Eyes Live! (Sunshine Records, released on July 1, 1989)
Siguro (Sunshine Records) (1989)
Naglalambing (Viva Records, 1992)
True Love (Alpha Music, 1995)
Pakita Mo (Star Music, 2000)
Beinte Na Hihirit Pa All Hits Live! (Vicor Music Corporation, 2006)

Songs
"Hindi Magbabago"
"Babaero" (1988)
"Siguro"
"Umiinit Umaapoy Lumiliyab"
"Nais"
"Naglalambing"
"Pagod ng Puso"
"'Di Ako Papayag"
"Pobreng Manliligaw"
"Tabi Tayo"
"True Love"
"Basta't Ika'y Maging Akin"
"Huwag Kang Paloloko"
"Senorita"
"Ikaw Lamang, Wala Nang Iba"
"Laman ng Kalsada"
"Eto Na Naman" (Original By Gary V.)
"Curtain of Your Heart"
"I'll Sing to You"
"Tayo Pa Rin"
"Pakita Mo"
"Nandiyan Na si Cardo" (2018)
"Dance & Sing (Basta May Social Distancing)" (2020)

Awards and recognition
Celebrity Inductee Winner, 10th Eastwood City Walk Of Fame Philippines 2015

References

External links
Randy Santiago Official Website

1960 births
Living people
De La Salle University alumni
20th-century Filipino male singers
Filipino Roman Catholics
Filipino songwriters
Filipino television directors
Filipino television variety show hosts
GMA Network personalities
ABS-CBN personalities
TV5 (Philippine TV network) personalities
Male actors from Manila
Intercontinental Broadcasting Corporation personalities
People's Television Network
Radio Philippines Network personalities
Singers from Manila